This is a list of United Kingdom members of the European Parliament for the 1999–2004 session.  The UK is divided into twelve constituencies, with varying numbers of members: one constituency each for Scotland, Wales and Northern Ireland, and one each for the nine Regions of England.

See MEPs for the UK 1999–2004 for an alphabetical list.

East Midlands
 Roger Helmer
 Mel Read
 Bill Newton Dunn
 Phillip Whitehead
 Christopher Heaton-Harris
 Nicholas Clegg

East of England
 Robert Sturdy
 Eryl McNally
 Christopher Beazley
 Bashir Khanbhai
 Richard Howitt
 Andrew Duff
 Geoffrey van Orden
 Jeffrey Titford

London
 Claude Moraes
 Theresa Villiers
 Robert Evans
 Charles Tannock
 Richard Balfe
 Sarah Ludford
 Ian Twinn
 Mary Honeyball (replaced resigned Pauline Green in 2000)
 John Bowis
 Jean Lambert

Northern Ireland
 Ian Paisley
 John Hume
 Jim Nicholson

North East England
 Gordon Adam
 Martin Callanan
 Alan Donnelly (resigned January 2000)
 Stephen Hughes
 Barbara O'Toole

North West England
 Richard Inglewood
 Arlene McCarthy
 Robert Atkins
 Gary Titley
 David Sumberg
 Chris Davies
 Terry Wynn
 Den Dover
 Brian Simpson
 Jacqueline Foster

Scotland
 David Martin
 Ian Hudghton
 Struan Stevenson
 Bill Miller
 Neil MacCormick
 John Purvis
 Elspeth Attwooll
 Catherine Stihler

South East England
 James Provan
 Roy Perry
 Peter Skinner
 Emma Nicholson
 Daniel Hannan
 James Elles
 Mark Watts
 Nigel Farage
 Nirj Deva
 Chris Huhne
 Caroline Lucas
 Marta Andreasen

South West England
 Caroline Jackson
 Giles Chichester
 Glyn Ford
 Graham Watson
 Alexandar Macmillan
 Graham Booth (replaced resigned Michael Holmes in 2002)
 Neil Parish

Yorkshire and the Humber
 Andrew Brons
 Edward McMillan Scott
 Linda McAvan
 Timothy Kirkhope
 David Bowe
 Diana Wallis
 Robert Goodwill
 Richard Corbett

Wales
 John Bufton
 Glenys Kinnock
 Jillian Evans
 Jonathan Evans
 Eluned Morgan
 Eurig Wyn

West Midlands
 John Corrie
 Simon Murphy
 Philip Bushill-Matthews
 Michael Cashman
 Malcolm Harbour
 Liz Lynne
 Philip Bradbourn
 Neena Gill

References 

1999